The EMD SD60 is a , six-axle diesel-electric locomotive built by General Motors Electro-Motive Division, intended for heavy-duty drag freight or medium-speed freight service. It was introduced in 1984, and production ran until 1995.

History and development 
The SD60 is essentially identical to the SD50 externally, but has a different prime mover, the new 16-cylinder EMD 710G3A, and a computer-controlled electrical system. Chicago & North Western's railroad manual estimated that the SD60 is 3% more fuel efficient than SD50, while a pair of SD60s was up to 16% more efficient than three SD40s pulling a standard coal train.

Norfolk Southern has been modernizing their old SD60s since 2010 into SD60Es, a model specific to NS.

Models
Several variants of the SD60 were built, including:

SD60
This was the original model, and had a conventional hood unit configuration with the 40 Series (spartan) cab first employed on the SD40-2.

SD60F
The SD60F was ordered and was operated by Canadian National and has a full-width cowl body and crashworthy "safety cab" with a four-piece windshield. CN retired the SD60F in 2017, however a handful were sold off and are still working on a shortline in North Dakota . 14 units are currently on the Aberdeen, Carolina & Western Railway in North Carolina.

SD60I
The SD60I model has a full-width short hood and features the so-called "WhisperCab" that was insulated from sound and vibration using a system of rubber gaskets. The same cab was later used on EMD's SD70I, SD75I, SD80MAC and SD90MAC locomotives. Only Conrail ordered this model, and after 1999 all were split between the Norfolk Southern and CSX. All SD60i locomotives have either have been scrapped, sold to new owners or retired.

SD60M
The SD60M features a "North American safety cab" design and has a full-width short hood. Early models until 1990 featured a three-piece windshield with vertical windows (nicknamed "triclops"), identical to the windshields found on EMD's SD40-2F and F59PH models. Later production from 1991 used two windshield panes that were sloped back, and had a somewhat shorter nose tapered on the sides. Purchasers of this model included Conrail, Union Pacific, Burlington Northern and the Soo Line Railroad. Conrail orders were split between the Norfolk Southern and CSX back in 1999. All Norfolk Southern and CSX SD60M locomotives have either been scrapped, sold to new owners, or retired.

SD60MAC
The SD60MAC is similar to the SD60M but is equipped with alternating current traction motors. Although four demonstrator SD60MAC units tested on the Burlington Northern proved the viability of EMD's AC traction system, all subsequent orders were for the SD70MAC locomotive.

SD60E

The SD60E is a custom rebuild of standard cab SD60 for Norfolk Southern created at the Juniata Shops with the prototype being delivered in 2010 and the majority of the production taking place between 2013 and 2017. The SD60E utilizes a new NS-designed wide nose cab with increased crash protection, new electronics and up-rating the engine to the 4000 hp 710G3B standard. Norfolk Southern bought additional SD60s from Helm Leasing specifically for the SD60E program with the aim to eventually rebuild 240 SD60s, however the project was terminated after 135 had been completed and Norfolk Southern's remaining inventory of unrebuilt SD60, SD60M and SD60I locomotives were subsequently sold or scrapped in 2019. In May 2021, Norfolk Southern regeared SD60E numbers 7034 and 7035 to go 79mph and assigned the locomotives to the railroad's Office Car Special train.

Current and original owners

See also 
List of GM-EMD locomotives
List of GMD Locomotives

References 

 
 
 The Diesel Shop Locomotive Rosters 
 Memória do Trem Locomotive Rosters Carajás Railroad

External links 

EMD 60 Series locomotives
SD60
SD60
C-C locomotives
Diesel-electric locomotives of the United States
Freight locomotives
Standard gauge locomotives of the United States
Standard gauge locomotives of Canada
Diesel-electric locomotives of Canada